Your Biggest Fan is the third official EP by the Austin, Texas-based indie pop band Voxtrot. Released on November 17, 2006, in the United States, it was available as both a three track CD and a two track 7" single.

The track "Trouble" was later released in the UK as a single.

Critical response 
Jack Rabid of AllMusic wrote: "Although Your Biggest Fan is weak-for-them Smiths-like piano pop further botched by producer Ben Hiller (Doves, Elbow) -- though the second half picks up a little -- both B-sides are better produced than the LP (sad, that!) and make the EP an important purchase, especially the onrushing "Trouble.""

Track listings

Personnel 

Voxtrot
 Ramesh Srivastavavocals, guitar
 Jared Van Fleetguitar, strings
 Mitch Calvertguitar
 Jason Chronisbass
 Matt Simondrums

Technical
 Erik Woffordengineering
 Ben Hillerproduction, mixing, engineering

Guest musicians
 Ames Asbellviola
 Sara Nelsoncello
 Tracy Seegerviolin
 Jennifer Moorebacking vocals

References 

Voxtrot albums
2006 EPs